The Rugby Championship of Serbia is highest level of rugby union competition in Serbia. The league was founded in 2006. after breakup of Serbia and Montenegro.

History
Prior to 1992, teams such as Partizan played in the Rugby Championship of SR Yugoslavia. From the 1992–93 season through until 2005–06, the Serbian teams played in the Serbia and Montenegro Championship. The competition then became the Rugby Championship of Serbia from 2006–07 onwards.

Teams
The teams in the Rugby Championship of Serbia as of 2019 are:

{|style= "table-layout:fixed; width=95%; margin-top:0;margin-left:0;  border-width:1px;border-style:none ;border-color:#ddd; padding:0px; vertical-align:top;"
|-
| valign=top | 
|
|-
| valign=top | 
|
|-
| valign=top | 
|
|}

Teams that previously participated in the Serbian Championship include: RK Dinamo Pancevo, RK Dorćol, RK Iron Fortress (from Smederevo), Royal Belgrade and (in Division B) RK Red Star and Balkan Mosquito. Other rugby clubs in Serbia include the junior team Singidunum RK, and the Belgrade Women's rugby club (Ženski ragbi klub Beograd). BRK Red Star also runs a sports program for people with disabilities.

Notes:
 RK Pobednik was renamed RK Rad (Labor RC) in December 2014. The club fields teams in both divisions of the national championship.
 This list might be incomplete.

Champions
Past winners of the Serbian Rugby Championship:

{| class="wikitable"
|-
!colspan=2|Rugby Championship of Serbia
|-
!Season!!Winner
|-
|2006–07 || Rugby Club Pobednik  
|-
|2007–08 || Rugby Club Pobednik   
|-
|2008–09 || Rugby Club Pobednik 
|-
|2009–10 || Rugby Club Pobednik  
|-
|2010–11 || Rugby Club Pobednik  
|-
|2011–12 || Rugby Club Pobednik  
|-
|2012–13 || Rugby Club Pobednik  
|-
|2013–14 || BRK Crvena Zvezda  
|-
|2014–15 || BRK Crvena Zvezda
|-
|2015–16 || BRK Crvena Zvezda
|-
|2016–17 || Rugby Club Rad  
|-
|2017–18 || Rugby Club Partizan  
|-
|2018–19 || Rugby Club Partizan  
|-
|2019–20 || Rugby Club Partizan 
|-
|2020–21 || Rugby Club Partizan
|}

See also
Rugby union in Serbia
Rugby Union of Serbia

References

External links
 Belgrade Rugby Union (in Serbian) official site

Rugby union in Serbia